Dario Krišto (born 5 March 1989) is a Croatian footballer who plays as a midfielder for Posušje.

Club career

DAC Dunajská Streda
He made his debut for DAC Dunajská Streda on 1 March 2014 against Košice.

References

External links
Corgoň Liga profile

1989 births
Living people
People from Tomislavgrad
Association football midfielders
Croatian footballers
NK Inter Zaprešić players
NK Rudeš players
HNK Zmaj Makarska players
HNK Šibenik players
HŠK Zrinjski Mostar players
NK Lučko players
NK Dugopolje players
FC DAC 1904 Dunajská Streda players
FK Frýdek-Místek players
FK Fotbal Třinec players
Widzew Łódź players
GKS Tychy players
HŠK Posušje players
Croatian Football League players
Premier League of Bosnia and Herzegovina players
First Football League (Croatia) players
Slovak Super Liga players
Czech National Football League players
II liga players
I liga players
Croatian expatriate footballers
Expatriate footballers in Bosnia and Herzegovina
Croatian expatriate sportspeople in Bosnia and Herzegovina
Expatriate footballers in Slovakia
Croatian expatriate sportspeople in Slovakia
Expatriate footballers in the Czech Republic
Croatian expatriate sportspeople in the Czech Republic
Expatriate footballers in Poland
Croatian expatriate sportspeople in Poland